Basil Trevor Kelly CBE (11 May 1930 – 11 August 2003) was a Bahamian former sailor who competed in the 1952 Summer Olympics, in the 1960 Summer Olympics, and in the 1964 Summer Olympics. He placed third at the Snipe World Championship in 1963.

References

1930 births
2003 deaths
Sportspeople from Nassau, Bahamas
Bahamian male sailors (sport)
Olympic sailors of the Bahamas
Sailors at the 1952 Summer Olympics – 5.5 Metre
Sailors at the 1960 Summer Olympics – 5.5 Metre
Sailors at the 1964 Summer Olympics – Dragon
Snipe class sailors